Leucocoryne (glory-of-the-sun) is a genus of bulbous perennials in the family Amaryllidaceae. The foliage of all species is long and narrow and has an onion-like scent. The blue, white or lilac flowers are held in umbels.

The entire genus is endemic to the Republic of Chile in South America. Some species are grown in gardens as ornamentals. They require very well-drained soil and do not tolerate freezing temperatures. L. purpurea, with purple flowers, has gained the Royal Horticultural Society’s Award of Garden Merit.

Derivation of genus name
The generic name Leucocoryne is a compound of the Greek elements λευκός ( = leucos ) "white" and κορυνε ( = korune ) "club" ( in the sense of cudgel or bludgeon ) - in reference to the pale, club-like, sterile anthers of the flowers.

Taxonomy

Species
Species accepted by The Plant List are listed here (49) although some authorities estimate only 15.

 Leucocoryne alliacea Lindl.
 Leucocoryne angosturae Ravenna
 Leucocoryne angustipetala Gay
 Leucocoryne appendiculata Phil.
 Leucocoryne arrayanensis Ravenna
 Leucocoryne candida Ravenna
 Leucocoryne codehuensis Ravenna
 Leucocoryne conconensis Ravenna
 Leucocoryne conferta Zoellner
 Leucocoryne coquimbensis F.Phil. ex Phil.
 Leucocoryne coronata Ravenna
 Leucocoryne curacavina Ravenna
 Leucocoryne dimorphopetala (Gay) Ravenna
 Leucocoryne editiana Ravenna
 Leucocoryne foetida Phil.
 Leucocoryne fragrantissima Ravenna
 Leucocoryne fuscostriata Ravenna
 Leucocoryne gilliesioides (Phil.) Ravenna syn. Erinna  gilliesioides Phil.
 Leucocoryne inclinata Ravenna
 Leucocoryne incrassata Phil.
 Leucocoryne ixioides (Sims) Lindl.
 Leucocoryne leucogyna Ravenna
 Leucocoryne lilacea Ravenna
 Leucocoryne lituecensis Ravenna
 Leucocoryne lurida Ravenna
 Leucocoryne macropetala Phil.
 Leucocoryne maulensis Ravenna
 Leucocoryne modesta Ravenna
 Leucocoryne mollensis Ravenna
 Leucocoryne narcissoides Phil. (discovered by Scottish botanist Thomas King)
 Leucocoryne odorata Lindl.
 Leucocoryne pachystyla Ravenna
 Leucocoryne pauciflora Phil.
 Leucocoryne porphyrea Ravenna
 Leucocoryne praealta Ravenna
 Leucocoryne purpurea Gay
 Leucocoryne quilimarina Ravenna
 Leucocoryne reflexa Grau
 Leucocoryne roblesiana Ravenna
 Leucocoryne rungensis Ravenna
 Leucocoryne simulans Ravenna
 Leucocoryne subulata Ravenna
 Leucocoryne taguataguensis Ravenna
 Leucocoryne talinensis Mansur & Cisternas
 Leucocoryne tricornis Ravenna
 Leucocoryne ungulifera Ravenna
 Leucocoryne valparadisea Ravenna
 Leucocoryne violacescens Phil.
 Leucocoryne vittata Ravenna

References

Bibliography 

 

Asparagaceae genera
Allioideae